Banjo Hackett: Roamin’ Free (also known as just Banjo Hackett) is a 1976 American Western television film directed by Andrew V. McLaglen, written by Ken Trevey, and starring Don Meredith, Ike Eisenmann and Chuck Connors. The film originally aired on May 3, 1976 on NBC and was a pilot for a possible series.

Plot summary
Traveling the frontier in the 1880s, Banjo Hackett, a horse trader receives a letter from his ailing sister. After rushing to his sister's hometown, he finds that his sister has recently died and her nine-year-old son Jubal Winner has already been sent to the local orphanage. Banjo helps the boy escape and takes him along to find Dido's Lament, the boy's mare, a gift from Uncle Banjo. The race is on to recover Dido and the foal the horse is carrying before bounty hunter Sam Ivory does.

Main cast
 Don Meredith as Banjo Hackett
 Ike Eisenmann as Jubal Winner
 Chuck Connors as Sam Ivory
 Slim Pickens as Lijah Tuttle
 Jennifer Warren as Mollie Brannen
 Gloria DeHaven as Lady Jane Gray
 L. Q. Jones as Sheriff Tadlock
 Jeff Corey as Judge Janeway
 Anne Francis as Flora Dobbs
 Albert Able as Rudolf, The Bettor

Home media
The title was released on DVD by Sony Pictures. However, as of 2021, the film has not been released on Blu-ray or in the digital format.

References

External links 
 
 
 
 

1976 television films
1976 Western (genre) films
1970s American films
1970s English-language films
American Western (genre) television films
Films about horses
Films directed by Andrew McLaglen
Films set in the 1880s
NBC network original films
Television films as pilots 
Works about bounty hunters